Ganga Aur Ranga (Hindi: गंगा और रंगा) is a 1994 Bollywood action film starring Kiran Kumar, Joginder and Shakti Kapoor. The film was released on 1 July 1994 under the banner of Jet Speed Movie Makers.

Story 
Thakur Dhanpath lives a wealthy lifestyle in a small village in India along with his wife, two daughters, and two sons. One of his sons is a hunchback named Ranga (Joginder Shelly). Dhanpath also has a younger brother, Narpath (Suresh Chatwal), both they do not get along, so much so that Narpath takes over the estate and throws Dhanpath and his family out of the house. Forced to live in destitution, Dhanpath encourages the village folks to speak out against Narpath's oppression.

cast
 Kiran Kumar as Police Commissioner
 Shakti Kapoor
 Joginder as Ranga
 Sahila Chadha as Ganga
 Suresh Chatwal as Thakur
Anil Kochar
 Huma Khan

Soundtrack

References

External links 

 

1994 films
1990s Hindi-language films
Films scored by Sonik-Omi